The UK Dance Singles Chart is a record chart compiled by the Official Charts Company (OCC) on behalf of the British record industry. It displays the highest-selling singles in the dance music genre of any given week. This is a list of the songs which were number one on the UK Dance Singles Chart during 2014. The dates listed in the menus below represent the Saturday after the Sunday the chart was announced, as per the way the dates are given in chart publications such as the ones produced by Billboard, Guinness, and Virgin.

Number-one singles

 – the single was simultaneously number-one on the singles chart.

Number-one artists

See also

 List of UK Singles Chart number ones of 2014
 List of UK Dance Albums Chart number ones of 2014
 List of UK Independent Singles Chart number ones of 2014
 List of UK R&B Singles Chart number ones of 2014
 List of UK Rock & Metal Singles Chart number ones of 2014

References

External links
Dance Singles Top 40 at the Official Charts Company
UK Top 40 Dance Singles at BBC Radio 1

2014 in British music
United Kingdom Dance Singles
2014